Berne is an unincorporated community in Crawford County, in the U.S. state of Iowa.

History
Berne was platted in 1899. It was named after Bern, in Switzerland.

Berne's population was 11 in 1915, and just 6 in 1925.

References

Unincorporated communities in Crawford County, Iowa
Unincorporated communities in Iowa